The oriental scops owl (Otus sunia) is a species of scops owl found in eastern and southern Asia.

Description
This is a small, variably plumaged, yellow-eyed owl with ear-tufts which are not always erect. It can be distinguished from the collared scops owl by its whitish scapular stripe, well-marked underparts, and lack of pale collar. There are two colour morphs, grey and rufous; intermediate forms also occur. Sexes are similar in appearance. Individuals may freeze with eyes half-closed when disturbed. The species has a repeated liquid call sounding like "tuk tok torok".

Distribution and habitat
The species has an extremely wide distribution across eastern and southern Asia, and is found in dry deciduous forests from Russia to Thailand. The owl nests in holes in trees during February–April.

References

oriental scops owl
Birds of East Asia
Birds of South Asia
Birds of Southeast Asia
oriental scops owl